Verónica Montes (born 19 February 1990 in Lima, Peru), is a Peruvian actress and model based in Miami, Florida. She is known for her performances in telenovelas such as El Señor de los Cielos, La Piloto, and Papá a toda madre.

Filmography

Film roles

Television roles

References

External links 

1990 births
Living people
21st-century Peruvian actresses
Peruvian expatriates in the United States
Peruvian television actresses
Actresses from Lima